Sadamali Kumuduni Dolawatte (born 10 February 1983, Colombo) is a Sri Lankan cricketer who has captained the Sri Lankan women's team in eight one-day internationals, six of them at the 2005 Women's Cricket World Cup. She has batted in positions from opening to number 10, but her highest score in women's ODI cricket is still the 10 she managed against England in 2005–06. She regularly bowled leg breaks before captaining the side, but in eight matches as captain she has not bowled more than five overs in any game.

References

External links
 

Sri Lankan women cricketers
Sri Lanka women One Day International cricketers
Sri Lanka women Twenty20 International cricketers
1983 births
Living people
Sri Lanka women cricket captains
Cricketers from Colombo